Ocnophilella is a monotypic moth genus belonging to the family Tineidae described by Thomas Bainbrigge Fletcher in 1940. Its only species, Ocnophilella autocrypta, described by Edward Meyrick in 1926, was found in Western Cape, South Africa.

References

Endemic moths of South Africa
Tineidae
Monotypic moth genera
Tineidae genera